Jack Wouterse (born 17 June 1957 in Soest) is a Dutch actor. His career as a movie actor took off with his role in the 1992 film The Northerners, directed by Alex van Warmerdam. Wouterse made his international debut in an episode of the TV series Band of Brothers. He frequently worked with murdered Dutch director Theo van Gogh.

Film
 Redbad (2018) - Willibrord.
 Kapitein Rob en het Geheim van Professor Lupardi (2007) - General.
 For a few marbles more (Voor een paar knikkers meer) (2006) – Father of Sofie (voice)
 Kameleon 2 (2005) – Piet Haan
 Too Fat Too Furious (Vet Hard) (2005) - Bennie
 06/05 de film (2004) - Van Dam
 Tow Truck Pluck (2004) - Father of Stamper
 Pietje Bell 2: De jacht op de tsarenkloon (2003) - Klok
 The Tulse Luper Suitcases, Episode 3: Antwerp (2003) - Erik van Hoyten
 The Tulse Luper Suitcases: The Moab Story (2003) - Erik van Hoyten
 Het wonder van Maxima (2003)
 Julie en Herman (2003) - Herman van Putten
 Peter Bell (Pietje Bell) (2002) - Klok
 Undercover Kitty (2001) - Van Weezel
 Magonia (2001) - Ramsey Nasser
 With great joy (Met grote blijdschap) (2001)- Ad Sipkes
 Baby Blue (2001) - Fiducia
 Zoenzucht (2000)
 Little Crumb (Kruimeltje) (1999) - visitor of Mrs. Koster
 Suzy Q (1999) - Ko, father of Suzy
 Enigma (1999) - Max
 Culluliod blues (1998) - Sjef
 Temmink: The Ultimate Fight (1998) - Temmink
 Een echte hond (1998) - father of Jan
 De Pijnbank (1998) - Peter de Bock
 Chez André (1997)
 In het belang van de staat (1997)
 De Wolkenfabriek (1997)
 Mortinho por Chegar a Casa (1996)- Max
 De Jurk (1996)
 De Schaduwlopers (1995)- man with suitcase
 Eenmaal geslagen, nooit meer bewogen (1995)- Charles
 Lang leve de koningin (1995) - the white king
 The Dead Man 2: Return of the Dead Man (1994)
 En Route (1993) - Lou
 Angie (1993)
 De drie beste dingen in het leven (1993) - Maarten
 De Noorderlingen / The Northerners (1992) - Jacob
 Op Afbetaling (1992) - Pees
 De Bunker (1992) - Ritter
 De onfatsoenlijk vrouw (1991) - man with tattoo

TV-series and cartoons
 Grijpstra & De Gier (2004-) - Henk Grijpstra
 Najib en Julia (2002) - Albert Ruisbroek
 Band of Brothers (2001) - Dutch Farmer
 , (1999–2001) - chairman
 Bed & Breakfast (1997) - Dirk
 Mus (1993) - ex-husband woman next door
 Uit de school geklapt (1993)  snackbarhouder Sjors
 Super Robot Monkey Team Hyperforce Go! (2005) voice of Otto
 De Legende van Tarzan, De Serie (2001) voice of Tantor

Awards and nominations
 1994 - Golden calf - Best Actor for En route
 1999 - Golden calf - Best actor for Suzy Q
 2001 - Golden FIPA - Best actor for Suzy Q

External links

1957 births
Living people
Dutch male film actors
Dutch male television actors
Dutch impressionists (entertainers)
Golden Calf winners
People from Soest, Netherlands